Cymbula safiana, common name the saffian limpet, is a species of sea snail, a true limpet, a marine gastropod mollusk in the family Patellidae, one of the families of true limpets.

Description
The size of the shell varies between 25 mm and 120 mm.

Distribution
This marine species has a wide distribution ranging from the Mediterranean Sea to Angola

References

 Nakano T. & Ozawa T. (2007). Worldwide phylogeography of limpets of the order Patellogastropoda: molecular, morphological and paleontological evidence. Journal of Molluscan Studies 73(1): 79–99.

External links
 

Patellidae
Molluscs described in 1771